Kolby is a given name. Notable people with the given name include:

Kolby Allard (born 1997), American baseball player
Kolby Carlile (born 1997), American Flat Track racer
Kolby Koloff (born 1996), American musician
Kolby LaCrone (born 1986), American soccer player
Kolby Listenbee (born 1994), American football player
Kolby Smith (born 1984), American football player

See also
Kolby (surname)